Cincorunia uncicornia is a species of moth of the family Tortricidae. It is found in Ecuador (Loja Province and Zamora-Chinchipe Province).

References

External links

Moths described in 2002
Endemic fauna of Ecuador
Euliini
Moths of South America
Taxa named by Józef Razowski